Otoyol 54, named Gaziantep Beltway and abbreviated as O-54, is a  long otoyol in Gaziantep, Turkey. The motorway serves as a beltway around the city of Gaziantep and connects to the O-52. The motorway was opened on 19 January 2013.

Exit list

Light blue indicates toll section of motorway.

See also
 List of highways in Turkey

References

External links
Mersin Diyarbakır road map

Transport in Gaziantep Province
54